Wamp 2 Dem is a commercial mixtape by English rapper Giggs. It was released on 6 October 2017 by No BS Music, while the mixtape was distributed by Island Records. It succeeds Giggs' fourth album Landlord (2016), released a year and two months prior, and is Giggs' first release with a major label. The mixtape includes guest appearances from American rappers 2 Chainz, Young Thug and Lil Duke, alongside Dave, Footsie, D Double E, Popcaan and Donae'o. Production was handled by Cool & Dre, London on da Track, Zaytoven, The Fanatix, Bricks Da Mane and Chris Childs, among others.

The mixtape was supported by one single – "Linguo" featuring Donae'o, which became Giggs' highest charting single.

Background
In August 2016, Giggs released his fourth album Landlord to positive reception, entering at number 2 on the UK Albums Chart. In early 2017, Giggs was featured on two tracks from Canadian rapper Drake's album More Life, "No Long Talk" and "KMT". The guest appearances led to significant widespread attention for Giggs and his music. The same month, Giggs announced the Wamp 2 Dem mixtape on The SN1 Snow on Beats 1 Radio.

Giggs described the mixtape as "a response to Americans who criticise UK rap", stating: "People wasn't really respecting England. Wamp 2 Dem was more showing where we're coming, [explaining that] we're the same as you."

The mixtape's artwork was unveiled in June 2017, while the release date was revealed on 4 September 2017 via Instagram.

Promotion
Wamp 2 Dem was promoted by Giggs through Instagram, posting teaser trailers compiling online reactions to his verse from Drake's "KMT", song previews and meme voiceovers. Numerous billboards and posters were set up around London the week leading up to the release.

Singles
The first single, "Linguo" featuring Donae'o, was released on 29 November 2017. The song peaked at number 28 on the UK Singles Chart, becoming Giggs' first solo single to enter the top 40 and thus his highest-charting solo single to date.

Release
Wamp 2 Dem was released on 6 October 2017 for iTunes purchase and streaming via Spotify and Apple Music, as well as purchase through Google Play and Amazon. The mixtape was also made available for free download through Giggs' official website.

Track listing

Personnel
Credits adapted from Tidal.

 Giggs – primary artist, executive producer
 2 Chainz – featured artist
 Bricks Da Mane – producer 
 Chris Childs – producer 
 Cool & Dre – producer, mixing 
 D Double E – featured artist
 Dave – featured artist
 Dirty Saj – recording engineer
 Donae'o – producer, featured artist 
 Flyo – producer 
 Footsie – featured artist
 Illa – producer 
 Jay Jay Heston – producer 
 Lil Duke – featured artist
 London on da Track – producer 
 M16 – producer 
 Narcos – producer 
 Popcaan – featured artist
 The Fanatix – producer 
 Young Thug – featured artist
 Zaytoven – producer

Charts

The Essence 

The Essence is a 3-part film series inspired by the soundtracks of Gigg's albums. Part one was released on 12 April 2019 on Giggs' YouTube channel. It was written by Michael 'Buck' Maris, Ashley Chin and April Walker. Myles Whittingham directed the film and it was produced by Mouktar Mohamed. Ashley Chin also plays a lead role in the film and also stars Dorcas Shola-Fapson, Rashid Kasirye with Giggs making a cameo in the film. It would be the second time Giggs has worked with Chin, the first being Victim. The film was sponsored by ASOS, True Religion, Nike, Inc., Adidas, Benjart, Fresh Ego Kid, Dollars and Pounds amongst others.

Part 2 was released on 20 December 2019 and was inspired by the soundtrack of the Giggs' album Big Bad.... The second part of the series touches on the topics of gun culture, suicide, and abortion, outlining serious issues that affect the community living their daily lives in the streets.

Part 3 was released a year later on 20 December 2020 and is inspired by the soundtrack of the Giggs mixtape Now Or Never.

Cast 

Ashley Chin as Isaac
 Michael Maris as Marcus
Dorcas Shola-Fapson as Ava
 Aymen Hamdouchi as Youssef
Suspect as Weebs
 Nico James as Jacob
Giggs as N.T.
Rashid Kasirye as Camera Man
 Harvey Allen

Episodes

References

2017 albums
Giggs (rapper) albums
2010s English-language films